Maumee Road Lands were a group of land tracts granted by the United States Congress to the state of Ohio in 1823 along the path of a proposed road in the northwest corner of the state.

History

With the Treaty of Greenville in 1795 the Indian Nations ceded southern and eastern Ohio to white settlement. In 1807, the Treaty of Detroit called for the cession of lands northwest of the Maumee River, mostly in the Michigan Territory. The area between the Maumee River and the 1805 boundary remained Indian Lands, and thus, the United States could not legally build a road connecting settlements in Ohio and the Michigan Territory. This area was also in the Great Black Swamp, and would require much engineering effort and funds to cross with a road.

On November 25, 1808, at Brownstown in Michigan Territory, the United States and five nations of Indians signed the Treaty of Brownstown.

In 1811, Congress appropriated $6,000 to explore, survey and mark a road sixty feet wide.  In 1815, Congress made provisions to survey the lands one mile (1.6 km) either side of the road path into tracts running parallel and perpendicular to path of the road, and sell them at the Canton Land Office. In 1816, the President was authorized to move the path of the road to pass through Fremont.  No action was taken on these counts, so, in 1820, the Ohio legislature asked Congress to take action.

All the land between the Maumee River and the Western Reserve was ceded by the Indians with the Treaty of Fort Meigs in 1817,  and surveyed into townships and sections in the Congress Lands North and East of the First Principal Meridian in 1821.

Grant by Congress

This grant became known as the “Maumee Road Lands“. In 1825 Ohio appropriated moneys to build the road, and provided for sale of granted lands to pay for it.

United States Route 20 is situated along the Maumee road.

See also
Ohio Lands

Notes

References

External links
Maumee Road Lands – Ohio History Central

Wood County, Ohio
Sandusky County, Ohio
History of Ohio